Łukasz Kuropaczewski (born 21 August 1981 in Gniezno) is a Polish musical artist.

Career 
He started playing the guitar at the age of 10. Since 1992, his musical education was conducted by Professor Piotr Zaleski from Poland. In 2003, Łukasz entered the Peabody Conservatory of Music of the Johns Hopkins University in Baltimore, MD, USA, where he studied with Manuel Barrueco.

Mr. Kuropaczewski has toured in Europe, USA, Canada, South America and Japan. He has appeared in music centers in Poland, Czech Republic, Belarus, Germany, France, Spain, Hungary, Canary Islands, Iceland, Greece, England, Japan, Panama, Canada and the USA.

He has performed as a soloist in such halls and festivals as: National Philharmony Hall, National Polish Radio Hall in Warsaw, Poland; Royal Festival Hall in London, England; Cactus Pear Music Festival in San Antonio, TX, USA; Manuel Barrueco Masterclass in Baltimore, USA; Nurtingen Guitar Festival in Nurtingen, Germany; Gitarren Konzerte Ansbach in Ansbach, Germany; and the International Guitar Festival in Tychy, Poland.

As a chamber musician, he has performed with a number of Polish Orchestras, which include National Polish Radio Symphony Orchestra. He performed the "Concierto de Aranjuez" with this orchestra conducted by British conductor Mark Fitz-Gerald on a special "Last Night of the Proms" concert in Cracow, Poland. He has also performed Vivaldi Concerti and Boccherini Quintets with several string quartets. He has collaborated with musicians from Poland, Los Angeles Symphony Orchestra, Cleveland Orchestra and San Antonio Symphony Orchestra. Lukasz also maintains a duo partnership with a virtuoso flutist Anastasia Petanova and the Baltimore Symphony Assistant Concertmaster Igor Yuzefovich.

Kuropaczewski has recorded four CDs. "Łukasz Kuropaczewski - Recital", "Kuropaczewski plays Spanish Music", "Concierto de Aranjuez", "Łukasz Kuropaczewski: Portrait".

In addition to his concert schedule, he is also a teacher, giving classes worldwide, and assisting Barrueco at the Peabody Conservatory, where he teaches guitar lessons and the repertoire class.

References

External links
 Official homepage

Polish classical guitarists
Living people
1981 births
People from Gniezno